Rhopalaea is a genus of tunicate belonging to the family Diazonidae. The genus has a cosmopolitan distribution in warm and temperate oceans.

Species
The genus Rhopalaea has 21 recognized species:

References

Enterogona
Tunicate genera
Taxa named by Rodolfo Amando Philippi